Peter Michaelsen Pisarczyk (born May 30, 1965), better known as Peter Keys, is an American keyboardist. He is best known for his work with George Clinton in various P-Funk lineups and as a member of the rock band Lynyrd Skynyrd since 2009.

Early life 
He was born in Burlington, Vermont, United States, to Michael Pisarczyk and Carole Bouchard.

Keys developed an interest in music at a young age as his parents played him to sleep with their 1923 Steinway piano. He began playing piano at age four and is classically trained. He had his first performance at the age of five in New Haven, Connecticut, at the Neighborhood School of Music. Keys was determined to make a living as a musician and moved to northern California in 1976 where he played with his first band Smeagol. After Smeagol's disbandment he started a cover band called Sound Advice. He studied music through 1985 and went to the Berklee College of Music in Boston, Massachusetts, before dropping out to continue performing.

Career 
After dropping out of Berklee, Keys moved to the San Francisco Bay area and began playing and recording with many notable musicians including Jay Lane (Primus, RatDog), Sam Andrew (Big Brother and the Holding Company), Peter Tork (The Monkees), Marty Friedman (Megadeth), Marty Balin (Jefferson Airplane/Starship) and Bill Spooner (The Tubes).

In 1996 he replaced Bernie Worrell in the original P-Funk lineup. Around this time he shared the stage with everyone from Bootsy Collins to Snoop Dogg and Isaac Hayes. In 2000 he moved to Detroit, Michigan, and started Shock Logic Productions. He joined the 420 Funk Mob in 2002, a band that features George Clinton and other former P-Funk members. From 2004 to 2009, Keys toured and recorded with the indie rock band SeepeopleS and is featured on three SeepeopleS' albums (Corn Syrup Conspiracy, Apocalypse Cow Volumes 1 & 2). In 2009, he moved to Nashville, and was selected to be Billy Powell's replacement in Lynyrd Skynyrd. When not touring with Lynyrd Skynyrd, Keys plays with a variety of other projects, including the Smoky White Devils.

References 

1965 births
Living people
American people of Polish descent
Lynyrd Skynyrd members
20th-century American keyboardists
21st-century American keyboardists
Blues rock musicians